Clayton Heath (born February  15, 1951) is an American former professional football running back who played in the National Football League (NFL) in 1976
for the Miami Dolphins and Buffalo Bills.

References

Living people
1951 births
American football running backs
Buffalo Bills players
Miami Dolphins players
Wake Forest Demon Deacons football players
People from Chester County, South Carolina